Mark Acres is a game designer who has worked primarily on role-playing games.

Career
Mark Acres assisted Rick Krebs assisting in his development of the role-playing game Gangbusters. Acres also worked with Jeff Grubb on ideas for TSR's 1984 Marvel Super Heroes roleplaying game. Between 1983 and 1984, approximately 200 people left TSR as a result of multiple rounds of layoffs; as a result Acres joined CEO John Rickets, as well as Andria Hayday, Gaye Goldsberry O'Keefe, Gali Sanchez, Garry Spiegle, Carl Smith, Stephen D. Sullivan, and Michael Williams in forming the game company Pacesetter on January 23, 1984. Acres did some freelance work for Mayfair Games after Pacesetter ceased publication in 1986.

His D&D design work includes Tomb of the Lizard King (1982) and New Beginnings (1991).

References

External links
 

Dungeons & Dragons game designers
Living people
Place of birth missing (living people)
Year of birth missing (living people)